This list is incomplete. You can help by adding correctly sourced information about other manufacturers.

As of 2018 there are approximately 35 active British car manufacturers and over 500 defunct British car manufacturers. This page lists car manufacturers that build or built cars in the United Kingdom.

Major current marques

Current manufacturers

A
AC (1908–present)
Alvis (2012–present)
Arash (2006–present)
Ariel (1999–present)
Aston Martin (1913–present)
Atalanta Motors (2011–present)
B
Bentley Motors (1919–present)
Bowler Offroad (1985–present)
BAC (2009–present)
Brooke (1991–present)

C
Caterham (1973–present)

D
David Brown (2013–present)

E
Eagle E-Types (2013–present)
Elemental Cars (2014–present)

G
Gibbs (2004–present)
Ginetta (1957–present)
Grinnall (1993–present)
Gardner Douglas Sports Cars (1990–present)
Great British Sports Cars (2006–present)

H
Hawk (1986–present)

J
JZR (1989–1998; 2000–present)
Jaguar Land Rover (2013–present) 

L
Lister (1954–1959; 1986–2006; 2013–present)
London EV Company (2013–present)
Lotus Cars (1952-present)

M
Marlin (1979–2019)
McLaren (1969–1970; 1993–1998; 2005–present)
MEV Ltd (2003–present)
Midas Cars (1978–present)
MK Automotive Ltd (1996–present)
Mini (1969-present)  
Morgan (1910–present)

N
Nissan Motors (1984-present)
Noble (1998–present)

P
Pembleton Motor Company (1999–present)
Pilgrim Cars (1985–present)
Perrinn (2011–present)
Prodrive (1984–present)

R
Radical (1997–present)
Riversimple (2007–present)
Rolls-Royce Motor Cars (1998–present)
Ronart (1984–present)

S
Sebring International (1994 - 2019; 2022?)

T
Triking (1978–present)
TVR (1947–present)
Tempest of England (1988–present)
Toyota (1989-present)
Trident Sports Cars (2002–present)
TR-Supercars (2018–present)
U
Ultima (1992–present)

V
Vauxhall Motors (1903-present) 

W
Wells Motor Cars (2021-present)
Westfield (1982–present)
Williams (1977–present)

Former manufacturers

A
Abbey (1922)
ABC (1920–1929)
Aberdonia (1911–1915)
Abingdon (1902–1903)
Abingdon (1922–1923)
Academy (1906–1908)
Accles-Turrell (1899–1901)
Ace (1912–1916)
Achilles (1904–1908)
Adams (1905–1914) (article)
Adamson (1912–1925)
Addison (1906)
Advance (1902–1912)
AEM (1987)
Aero Car (1919–1920)
Aeroford (1920–1925)
Africar (1982–1988)
AGR (1911–1915)
Ailsa (1907–1910) 
Ailsa-Craig (1901–1910)
Airedale (1919–1924)
AJS (1930–1932)
Albany (1903–1905) (steam)
Albany (1971–1997)
Albatros (1923–1924)
Alberford (1922–1924)
Albert (1920–1921)
Albion (1900–1913)
ALC (1913)
Alex (1908)
Allard (1899–1902)
Allard (1937–1960)
Alldays & Onions (1898–1918)
Allwyn (1920)
All-British (1906–1908)
Alta (1931–1947)
Alvechurch (1912)
Alvis (1919–1967)
Amazon (1921–1922)
AMC (1910) (steam)
André (1933–1934)
Anglian (1905–1907)
Anglo-American (1899–1900)
Anglo-French (1896–1897)
Angus-Sanderson (1919–1927)
Arab (1926–1928)
Arbee (1904)
Archer (1920)
Arden (1912–1916)
Argon (1908)
Argyll (1899–1928; 1976–1990)
Ariel (1898–1915; 1922–1925)
Arkley (1970–1995)
Armadale (1906–1907)
Armstrong (1902–1904)
Armstrong (1913–1914)
Armstrong Siddeley (1919–1960)
Armstrong Whitworth (1904–1919)
Arno (1908)
Arnold (1896–1898)
Arnott (1951–1957)
Arrol-Aster (1927–1931)
Arrol-Johnston (1896–1928)
Arsenal (1898–1899)
Ascari (1995–2010)
Ascot (1904)
Ascot (1928–1930)
Ashley (1954–1962)
Ashton-Evans (1919–1928)
Asquith (1901–1902)
Aster (1922–1930)
Astra (1954–1959)
Astral (1923–1924)
Atalanta (1915–1917)
Atalanta (1937–1939)
Athmac (1913)
Atkinson and Philipson (1896)
Atomette (1922)
Attila (1903–1906)
Aurora (1904)
Ausfod (1947–1948)
Austin (1906–1989)
Austin-Healey (1952–1971)
Autocrat (1920s) (see Hampton)
Autotrix (1911–1914)
Autovia (1936–1938)
AV (1919–1924)
Axon (2005–2020)

B
Baby Blake (1922)
Baker & Dale (1913)
Bamby (1984)
Banham Conversions (1970s–2004)
Bantam (1913)
Barnard (1921–1922)
Barnes (1904–1906)
Batten (1935–1938)
Baughan (1920–1929)
Bayliss-Thomas (1922–1929)
Beacon (1912–1914)
Bean (1919–1929)
Beardmore (1919–1966)
Bell (1920)
Belsize (1901–1925)
Berkeley (1913)
Berkeley (1956–1960)
Bifort (1914–1920)
Billings-Burns (1900)
Black Prince (1920)
Blériot-Whippet (1920–1927)
BMA (1952–1954)
Boncar (1905–1907) (steam)
Bond (1948–1974)
Bolsover (1902) (steam)
Bound (1920)
Bow-V-Car (1922–1923)
BPD (1913)
Brabham (1962–1992)
Bradbury (mainly motorcycles, 1902–1924)
Bradwell (1914)
Breckland (2000–2009)
Bremer (1892, first British car)
Bridgwater (1904–1907)
Bristol (1946–2020)
Britannia (1913–1914)
British Racing Motors (1949–1997)
British Salmson (1934–1939)
Briton (1909–1928)
Broadway (1913)
Brooke (1901–1913)
Brotherhood (1904–1907)
Brough Superior (1935–1939)
BSA (1907–1926; 1929–1940; 1958–1960)
Buckingham (1914–1923)
Buckler (1947–circa 1962)
Butler (1888–1896)
Burney (1930–1933)
Bushbury Electric (1897)

C
C & H (car) (Corfield & Hurle) (article)
Calcott (1913–1926)
Calthorpe (1905–1926)
Cambro (1920–1921)
Campion (1893–1926)
Cannon
Caparo (2006–2019)
Carden (1912–1923)
Carlette (1913)
Carter
Castle Three (1919–1922)
Century Engineering (1885-1907)(:de: Century Engineering) 
Certus (1907–1908)
CFB (1920–1921)
CFL
Centaur (1974–1978)
Chambers (1904–1929)
Charawacky (1894–1914)
Chater-Lea (1907–1922)
Chota (1912–1913)
Christchurch-Campbell (1922)
Clan (1971–1974; 1982–1985)
Clarendon (1902–1904)
CLEVER (2006–2012?)
Climax (1905–1909)
Climax Cars Ltd (2007–2018)
Cluley (1921–1928)
Clyno (1922–1930)
Connaught (1952–1959)
Connaught (2004–2016)
Cook (circa 1901–1902) (steam)
Cooper (1947–1951)
Corona (1920–1923)
Coronet (1904–1906)
Coronet (1957–1960)
Coventry (1896–1903)
Coventry-Eagle (1899)
Coventry Premier (1912–1923)
Coventry Victor (1926–1938)
Cripps
Crompton
Crossley (1904–1937)
Crouch (1912–1928)
Crowdy (1909–1912)
Croxted (1904–1905)
Cubitt (1920–1925)
Cumbria (1914) (article)
CWS

D
Daimler (1896–2012)
Dalgliesh-Gullane (1907–1908)
Dallison (1913)
Dawson (1919–1921)
Dayton (1922)
Deasy (1906–1911)
Deemster (1914–1924)
Derek (1925–1926)
Dellow (1949–1959)
DeLorean (1981–1982) 
Dennis (1895–1915)
Dewcar (1913–1914)
Diva (1961–1966)
D.Ultra (1914–1916)
DL (1913–1920)
Douglas (1913–1922)
Dunalistair (1925–1926)
Duo (1912–1914)
Duplex (1919–1921)
Dursley-Pedersen (1912)
Mr. Hinsz (1900)

E
Eadie (1898–1901)
Eaglet (1948)
Economic (1921–1922)
Edismith (1905)
Edmond
Edmund
Edwards
E.J.Y.R. (Rutherford) (1906–1912) (steam)
Ekstromer (1905)
Electric Motive Power (1897)
Electromobile (1901–1920)
Elswick (1903–1907)
Elva (1958–1968)
Emms (1922–1923)
Endurance (1899–1901)
Enfield (1969–1973)
English Mechanic (1900–1913)
English Racing Automobiles (Active from 1933–1954, later made the Mini ERA Turbo)
Esculapeus (1902)
Eterniti (2010–2014)
Evante (1983–1994)
Excelsior (1896 motorcycles; 1922–1926 cars)
EYME

F
Fairthorpe (1954–1973)
Farboud (1999–2006)
Farbio (2005–2010)
FBS (2001-2003)
Ford (1909–2002)
Foy Steel (1913–1916)
Frazer Nash (1924–1957)
Frisky (1958-1961)

G
Galloway (1920–1928)
Garrard (1904)
Garrard & Blumfield (1894–1896)
GB
Geering (1899–1904)
Gerald (1920)
Gibbons (1917–1929)
Gilbern (1959–1973)
Gilbert (1901)
Gilburt (1904–1905)
Gill (1958–1960)
Gillyard
Glover
GN (1910–1925)
Gnome
Godfrey-Proctor (1928–1929)
Godsal (1935)
Gordano
Gordon (1903–1904)
Gordon (1912–1916)
Gordon (1954–1958)
Gordon GT (1959)
Gordon-Keeble (1960–1961; 1964–1967)
Gordon Newey 
Grahame-White
Grose (1898–1901)
GTM Cars (1967-2022)
Guildford
Guy (circa 1919–1932)
GWK (1911–1931)
Gwynnes (1922–1929)
Gwynne-Albert (1923–1929)

H
Hampton (1911–1933)
HCE (1912–1913)
Healey (1946–1954)
Hewett Car (circa 1900)
Hewinson-Bell (circa 1900)
Heybourn
Hill & Stanier (1914)
Hillman (1907–1976)
HMC
Horley (automobile) (1904-1909) - The Horley Motor & Engineering Co. Ltd
Horstmann (1914–1929)
Honda (1985-2021)
Howard
Howett
HP (1926–1928)
HRG (1936–1956)
Hubbard (1904–1905)
Humber (1896–1976)

I
Iden (1904–1907)
Imperial (1901–circa 1906; 1904–1905; 1914)
Invacar (1947–1977)
Invicta
Invicta (1900–1905; 1913–1914; 1925–1950; 2004–2012)
Iris (1906–1925)

J
James and Browne (1901–1910)
Jappic (1925)
J. A. Ryley (article)
JBA (1982–2007)
JBS
Jensen (1936–1976; 1983–1992; 1999–2002)
Jensen-Healey (1972–1976)
Jewel
Joel-Rosenthal (1899–circa 1902)
John O'Gaunt (1901–1904)
Jones
Jowett (1906–1954)

K
Karminski (1902)
Keating (2008–2021)
Keenelet (1904) (steam)
Kendall
Kieft (1954–1955)
Kingsburgh (1901–1902)
Knight (1895)
Kyma (1903–1905)
Kadirovich Motors (1897-1926)

L
La Rapide
LAD (1913–1926)
Ladas (1906)
Lagonda (1906–1964)
Lambert (1911–1912)
Lammas-Graham (1936–1938)
Lanchester (1895–1956)
Land Master (1970s–1980s)
Laurence-Jackson (1920)
LEC
Lecoy (1921–1922)
Lea-Francis (1903–1906; 1920–1935; 1937–1952; 1980; 1999)
Lee Stroyer (1903–1905)
Lems (1903–1904)
Lester Solus (1913)
Leuchters (1898)
Leyland (1896) (steam)
Leyland (1920–1923)
Lifu (1899–1902) (steam)
Lington
LM (Little Midland) (1910–1922)
Lloyd (1936–1950)
Loyd-Lord (1922-1924) (See Vivian Loyd & Loyd Carrier (1938)) 
Lonsdale (1982–1983)
Lotis (1908–1912)
LTI (sometimes Carbodies) (1919–2013)
Lucar (1913–1914)

M
Matchless (mostly motorcycles, but offered a cyclecar in 1912)
Madelvic (1898–1900)
Maiflower (1919–1921)
Marauder (1950–1952)
Marcos (1959–2007)
Marcus
Marendaz (1926–1936)
Marlborough (1906–1926)
Marshall-Arter (article)
Maudslay (1902–1923)
MCC (1902–1904) (steam)
Mead & Deakin (Medea) (article)
Medinger (article)
Menley
Metrocab (1987–2021)
Meteorite (article)
Metro-Tyler (article)
MG Cars (1923–2005)
MG Motor (2006–2016)
Morris (1913–1983)
Motor Carrier (1904)

N
Napier (circa 1900–1924) 
Napoleon (1903)
Neale (1896) 
New British (1921–1923)
New Engine Company Ltd (1905–1921)
New Carden (1923–1925)
New Hudson (1903–1943)
New Imperial Motors (1887; 1901; various guises 1912–1939) (motorcycles)
New Speedwell Motor Co., Ltd (1900–1908)
Newey (1907–1921)
Nomad (1925–1926) (article)
North Star (article)
Norma
Nova (1971–1996)

O
Ogle (1960–1972)
OK-Supreme (1899)
Omega (1925–1927)
One of the Best (1905)
Oppermann (1898–1907)
Orpington (1907–1920s)
OVIK Crossway (2008–2020)
Owen Petelectra (1906)

P
Palladium (1912-1924)
Palm (1922–1923)
Palmerston (1920–1922)
Panther (1972–1992)
Paragon (article)
Paramount (1950–1956)
Parker (1899–1902) (steam)
Paydell (1924–1925)
Payze (1920–1921)
Pearson & Cox (1913) (steam)
Peel (1955–1966)
Peerless (1957–1960)
Perry (1913–1916)
Phoenix (1903–1926)
Phoenix (1905)
Pickering, Darley & Allday (PDA) (1912–1913)
Piper (1967–1975)
Premier (PMC) (article)
Princess
Projecta (1914)
Pyramid (article)

Q
Quadrant (1905–1906)
Quasar-Unipower (1968)
Queen (1904–1905)

R
Railton (1933–1950; 1989–1994)
Ralph Lucas (1901–circa 1908)
Ranger (article)
Rapier (1933–1937)
Raymond Mays V8 (1938–1939)
Reliant (1952–2002)
Renault (at least in 1951)
Rex (1901–1914)
Richardson (1903)
Richardson (1919)
Rickett (1858–1860) (steam)
Ridley (1901–1907)
Riley (1898–1969)
Robertson (1915–1916) (article)
Robinson & Price (1905–1914)
Rochdale (1952–1968)
Rodley (1954–1956)
Rollo (1911–1913)
Roper-Corbet (1911–1913)
Rover (1904–2005)
Royal Enfield (1899–1967)
Royal Ruby (1909–1932)
RTC (Rene Tondeur) (article)
Rudge (1912–1913)
Russon (1951–1952)
Ruston-Hornsby (1919–1924)
RW Kit Cars (1983–2000)
Ryley (1901–1902)
Rytecraft (1934–1940)

S
Santler (1889–1922)
Scootacar (1957–1964)
Scott (1921–1925)
Senlac (1901)
Sharp's (1949–1974)
Sheffield-Simplex (1907–1920)
Sherpley (1997–2007)
Siddeley (1902–1904; 1912–1919)
Siddeley-Deasy (1906–1919)
Simplic (1914)
Simpson (1897–1904) (steam)
Sinclair (1984–1985)
Singer (1901–1970)
Sizaire-Berwick
Skeoch (1921)
Skirrow (1936–1939) 
Smith & Dowse (1900)
Spectre Supersports (1977)
Speedex (1958-1962)
Speedy (article)
Sports Junior (1920–1921)
Squire (1935–1936)
SS (1934–1945)
Standard (1903–1963)
Star (1898–1932)
Sterling (1987–1992)
Stesroc (1905–1906) (steam)
Storey (1920–1931)
Straker-Squire (1906–1925)
Strathcarron (1998–2001)
Suffolk Jaguar (1990–2020) 
Sunbeam (1899–1937; 1953–1976)
Sunbeam-Talbot (1938–1954)
Swallow (1927–1933)
Swallow Doretti (1954–1955)
Swift (1900–1931)

T
Talbot (1903–1938)
Tamplin (1919–1925)
T.B. (Thompson Brothers) (1919–1924)
Tiny (1912–1915)
Tippen (Frank) Ltd of Coventry, Invalid Carriages (1935–1967)
Tornado (1958–1964)
Tourette (1956–1958)
Toward & Philipson (1897)
Trident (1965–1978)
Triumph (1923–1984)
Trojan (1922–1936; 1962–1965)
Turner-Miesse (1902–1913) (steam)
Turner (1902–1928)
Turner (1951–1966)
Tyseley (1912–1914)

U
Unipower (1966–1970)
Unique (article)
Urecar (1923)
Utopian (1914)

V
VAL
Vale (1932–1935)
Valveless (1908–1915)
Vanden Plas (1960–1980)
Vanwall (1954–1960)
Vapomobile (1902–1904)
Vee Gee (1913)
Veloce (circa 1900)
Velox (1902–1904)
Victor (1916–1920)
Vulcan (1902–1928)

W
Warfield (1903) (steam)
Warne (1913–1915)
Warren-Lambert (1912–1922)
Waverley (1910-1928)
Westall
Wherwell
Warwick (1960–1962)
Weigel (1906–1909)
Whitgift (article)
Whitlock (1903–1932)
Wigan-Barlow (1922–1923)
Wilbrook (1913)
Williamson (1913–1916) 
Wilson-Pilcher (1901–1904)
Willis (1913)
Windsor (British automobile) (1924–1927)
Winson (1920)
Wooler (1919–1920)
Winter (1913–1914)
Wolseley (1896–1975)
Woodrow (1913–1915)
Wrigley (1913)
WSC (Wholesale Supply Company) (1914) (article)
Wyvern (1913–1914)

X
Xtra (1922–1924)

Y
YEC (1907–1908)

Z
Zendik (1912–1913)
Zenith (1905–1906)
Zenos (2012–2017)
Zolfe Cars (2008–2016)

See also
Automotive industry in the United Kingdom
List of automobile manufacturers
List of automobile marques
List of current automobile manufacturers by country
List of current automobile marques
List of microcars by country of origin
Timeline of motor vehicle brands
Cyclecars U.K.
List of steam car makers

Notes

Other sources 

 G.N. Georgano, Nick (Ed.). The Beaulieu Encyclopedia of the Automobile. Chicago: Fitzroy Dearborn Publishers, 2000. 

Car manufacturers

Cars
Lists of automobile manufacturers
Cars